"The Doorman" is the 104th episode of the NBC sitcom Seinfeld. This is the 18th episode for the sixth season. It aired on February 23, 1995. In this episode, Jerry and Elaine contend with a creepy doorman, George fears he is developing male breasts, and Kramer and Frank Costanza try to go into business with a bra for men.

Plot
Jerry goes to pick up Elaine who is house sitting Mr. Pitt's apartment, and has an awkward conversation with the doorman. Jerry insists on waiting until the doorman leaves before he and Elaine can go to the movies. However, Mr. Pitt calls and orders Elaine to stay and read the mail. Walking home, Jerry meets the doorman standing outside his own apartment building. The doorman accuses him of following him and harassing him. Walking down the street, Kramer, with the thought that it would entertain German tourists on a tour bus, simulates robbing George.

Since George's parents' separation in "The Chinese Woman", Frank Costanza has been living with George. After discovering that his father has large breasts, George fears it may be hereditary, while Kramer is inspired to invent a male undergarment for breast support. George talks with his mother Estelle to convince her to take back Frank and inquire about his grandmother's bosom size. When George and Estelle arrive at his apartment, they catch Frank trying on the prototype for Kramer's undergarment. She leaves in horror at their “wild transvestite party.”

Jerry encounters the doorman again at Mr. Pitt's building, this time on the night shift. Jerry tries to make peace with him. The doorman leaves Jerry in charge while he goes out to buy a beer. Jerry adjusts to the job, even signing for a package, but as the doorman is taking too long, Jerry leaves his post and heads to Mr. Pitt's apartment. When Jerry and Elaine head back down, the police are there because a couch was stolen from the lobby. Jerry thinks the doorman set him up. He and Elaine deny that he even spoke to the doorman. However, the doorman has the package with Jerry's signature as evidence, so Jerry and Elaine must replace the stolen couch. George suggests they take his, because then his father will have no place to sleep and will have to move back with his mother. Kramer and Frank present their male bra to bra salesman Sid Farkus; Kramer calls his invention "the Bro", although Frank prefers "the Manssiere". Kramer, Frank, and Farkus make a deal, until Farkus asks permission to date Estelle. Angered, Frank cancels the deal.

When Estelle tells Frank she is going to dinner with Farkus, he refuses to move back in with her, regardless of having no place to sleep at George's. George is left with no choice but to share his bed with his father.

As Kramer walks the street carrying a stereo, the German tourists see him and try to stop him. Kramer staves off their anger by introducing "the Bro" to them. Jerry and Elaine deliver the couch to Mr. Pitt's building. Poppie, the man who involuntarily peed on the couch in "The Couch", happens to be there visiting a friend. Poppie recalls how his gastrointestinal problems were because of the stress caused by Elaine. When he sees Elaine, he becomes stressed and sits again on the couch.

Production
The "Bro" versus "Manssiere" argument was based on a real argument during the episode's production. Writers Tom Gammill and Max Pross used "the Bro" in the script for the episode, but Seinfeld co-creator Larry David contended that "the Manssiere" would be funnier. Kramer's performance for the German tourists was also real life based; Gammill and Pross would act out New York stereotypes for the benefit of sightseeing buses, including pretending to mug each other.

The doorman was played by Larry Miller, who was Jerry Seinfeld's best friend and one of two finalists for casting the part of George Costanza. Pross had worked as a doorman one summer, and once saw a doorman he worked with standing outside his own apartment building, which he thought "was insane", inspiring Jerry's street encounter with the doorman. The dim lighting and dialogue style in the scene where Jerry and Elaine discuss how to escape blame for the stolen couch were designed to evoke the film noir genre.

The scene where Kramer is pursued by the German tourists was added by Larry David, and is a parody of a scene from Marathon Man where Laurence Olivier's Nazi character is pursued by Holocaust survivors. The scene with George in bed with his father required numerous takes because actor Jason Alexander kept on cracking up with laughter every time Jerry Stiller offered him the kasha.

References

External links

Seinfeld (season 6) episodes
1995 American television episodes